Lake is an English surname. 

For the numerous British and Irish baronets of that name, see: 
 Lake baronets. 

Other notable people with the surname include:

 Alan Lake (1940–1984), British actor
 Alice Lake (1895–1967), American actress
 Anthony Lake (born 1939), former U.S. National Security Advisor
 Arthur Lake (disambiguation), several people
 Bill Lake (fl. 1974–present), Canadian actor
 Brandon Lake (musician), American contemporary worship musician
 Brian Lake (born 1982), Australian rules footballer
 Carnell Lake (born 1967), American football player
 Chris Lake (born 1982), English house music DJ and producer
 Dayan Lake (born 1997), American football player
 Denton D. Lake (1887–1941), New York politician
 Florence Lake (1904–1980), American actress and sister of the actor Arthur Lake
 George Hingston Lake (1847–1900) politician of South Australia
 George Lake (footballer) (1889–1918), English footballer
 Greg Lake (1947–2016), British bass guitarist and singer
 Harry Lake (disambiguation), several people
 Iona Lake (born 1993), British steeplechaser
 I. Beverly Lake Jr. (1934–2019), American judge, lawyer, and politician
 I. Beverly Lake Sr. (1906–1996), American judge and lawyer
 John Lake (disambiguation), several people
 James A. Lake (born 1941), American evolutionary biologist
 James Andrew Trehane Lake (c. 1840 – 1876) politician of South Australia
Josée Lake (born 1963 or 1964), Canadian paralympic swimmer and thalidomide survivor
 Junior Lake (born 1990), Dominican baseball player
 Kerin Lake (born 1990), Welsh rugby union player
 Kirsopp Lake (1872–1946), British New Testament scholar                  
 Lauren Lake (born 1969), family lawyer, author, television presenter, interior designer, and background vocalist
 Leonard Lake (1945–1985), American serial killer 
 Nathan Lake (born 1992), English squash player
 Patricia Lake (1923–1993), American actress and socialite
 Paul Lake (born 1968), English footballer
 Phipps W. Lake (1789–1860), Wisconsin politician
 Quentin Lake (born 1999), American football player
 Ricki Lake (born 1968), American actress and television personality
 Simon Lake (1866–1945), American naval engineer and inventor
 Steve Lake (born 1957), American baseball player
 Stuart Lake (baseball) (born 1971), American college baseball coach
 Suzy Lake (born 1947), Canadian artist
 Veronica Lake (1922–1973), American film actress
 Wells Lake (politician) (born c. 1773), York politician
 Dame Louise Lake-Tack (born 1944), Antiguan politician

See also
Laker (surname)

English-language surnames